Pinalia spicata is a species of orchid.

References

spicata